Ernesto Minetto (28 February 1935 – 8 March 1991) was an Italian racing cyclist. He rode in the 1963 Tour de France.

References

External links
 

1935 births
1991 deaths
Italian male cyclists
Place of birth missing
Sportspeople from the Province of Alessandria
Cyclists from Piedmont